Mihály Antos (2 April 1880 – 7 April 1937) was a Hungarian gymnast. He competed in the men's artistic individual all-around event at the 1908 Summer Olympics.

References

External links
 

1880 births
1937 deaths
Hungarian male artistic gymnasts
Olympic gymnasts of Hungary
Gymnasts at the 1908 Summer Olympics
Place of birth missing
Sportspeople from the Austro-Hungarian Empire